The third USS Emerald (PYC-1), was a yacht built in 1922 as Tamarack IV by the  Consolidated Shipbuilding Company in Morris Heights, New York. She was acquired by the US Navy on 25 October 1940 and commissioned 27 December 1940.

World War II service 
After calling at Norfolk, Virginia Emerald arrived at Jacksonville, Florida, 13 February 1941 for patrol duty off the Florida coast, and served as harbor entrance control station in Saint Johns River between December 1941 and March 1942. Her last service was as examination ship at Key West, and on 31 May Emerald arrived at Miami, where she lay until decommissioned 11 August 1942. She was transferred to the Maritime Commission for disposal 13 November 1945.

References

External links
A New Tamarack IV
 56th Annual List of Merchant Vessels of the United States

   hazegray.org: USS Emerald

Patrol vessels of the United States Navy
Patrol vessels of the United States
World War II patrol vessels of the United States
Ships built in Morris Heights, Bronx
1922 ships